Wolfgang Straub (born 1969, in Waiblingen) is a Swiss lawyer and photographer.

Photographic works 
His series of still lifes ‘Le dictionnaire des analphabètes’ deal with visual evidence of the paradoxical.

His 'Enchanted Gardens' series deals with conveying an emotional content by means of altering forms of expression.

Straub's works are present in several public and private collections.

Photographic publications 
Enchanted Gardens, Wyss Bern/Museum Franz Gertsch Burgdorf 2010,  and

Solo exhibitions 
2009 Museum Franz Gertsch, Burgdorf
2010 Leica Gallery Switzerland, Biel

Notes

External links 
 Official website
 "Wolfgang Straub – Enchanted Gardens" – Museum of Franz Gertsch

1969 births
Living people
People from Waiblingen
Swiss photographers